Do not confuse it with another fish called the kutum, Rutilus kutumRutilus frisii, called the vyrezub, Black Sea roach, or kutum,  is a species of fish in the family Cyprinidae, native to the basins of the Black Sea, Sea of Azov, and Sea of Marmara from the rivers of Bulgaria to western Transcaucasia and in Lake Iznik (Turkey).

The related Caspian Sea fish Rutilus kutum (also called kutum, Caspian kutum) has been treated as a subspecies of R. frisii (i.e. R. frisii kutum.), but the name kutum is applied to R. frisii'' itself in FishBase, referring to official names of FAO and AFS.

References

Fish described in 1840
Freshwater fish of Europe
Freshwater fish
Fish of Europe
frisii
Taxa named by Alexander von Nordmann
Taxonomy articles created by Polbot